Last is a feature on Earth's Moon, a crater in the Hadley–Apennine region.  Astronauts David Scott and James Irwin landed the Lunar Module Falcon on the northern edge of it in 1971, on the Apollo 15 mission.

Last crater is located approximately 2 km east of Hadley Rille and approximately 1 km northwest of Index, the intended landing point.

The name of the crater was formally adopted by the IAU in 1973.

External links
 Apollo 15 Traverses, Lunar Photomap 41B4S4(25)

References

Impact craters on the Moon